Assam is a state in northeastern India, south of the eastern Himalayas along the Brahmaputra and Barak River valleys. Assamese and Boro are the official languages of Assam, while Bengali is an additional official language in the Barak Valley.

Assam is known for Assam tea and Assam silk. The state was the first site for oil drilling in Asia. Assam is home to the one-horned Indian rhinoceros, along with the wild water buffalo, pygmy hog, tiger and various species of Asiatic birds, and provides one of the last wild habitats for the Asian elephant. The Assamese economy is aided by wildlife tourism to Kaziranga National Park and Manas National Park, which are World Heritage Sites. Dibru-Saikhowa National Park is famed for its feral horses. Sal tree forests are found in the state which, as a result of abundant rainfall, look green all year round. Assam receives more rainfall than most parts of India; this rain feeds the Brahmaputra River, whose tributaries and oxbow lakes provide the region with a distinctive hydro-geomorphic environment.

Etymology 

The first dated mention of the region comes from Periplus of the Erythraean Sea (1st century) and Ptolemy's Geographia (2nd century), which calls the region Kirrhadia, apparently after the Kirata population. In the classical period and up to the 12th century, the region east of the Karatoya river, largely congruent to present-day Assam, was called Kamarupa, and alternatively, Pragjyotisha. Though a western portion of Assam as a region continued to be called Kamrup, the Ahom kingdom that emerged in the east, and which came to dominate the entire Brahmaputra valley, was called Assam (e.g. Mughals used Asham); and the British province too was called Assam.  Though the precise etymology of Assam is not clear, the name Assam is associated with the Ahom people, originally called Shyam (Shan).

History

Pre-history 

Assam and adjoining regions have evidences of human settlement from the beginning of the Stone Age. The hills at the height of 1,500 to 2,000 feet (460–615 m) were popular habitats probably due to availability of exposed dolerite basalt, useful for tool-making.
Ambari site in Guwahati has revealed Shunga-Kushana era artefacts including flight of stairs and a water tank which may date from 1st century BCE and may be 2,000 years old. Experts speculate that another significant find at Ambari is Roman era Roman roulette pottery from the 2nd century BCE.

Legend 

According to a late text, Kalika Purana (c. 9th–10th century CE), the earliest ruler of Assam was Mahiranga Danav of the Danava dynasty, which was removed by Naraka of Mithila and established the Bhauma dynasty. The last of these rulers, also Naraka, was slain by Krishna.  Naraka's son Bhagadatta became the king, who (it is mentioned in the Mahabharata) fought for the Kauravas in the battle of Kurukshetra with an army of kiratas, chinas and dwellers of the eastern coast. At the same time towards the east in central Assam, Asura Kingdom was ruled by another line of kings.

Ancient era 

Evidence indicates presence of civilization in Assam around 2nd century BCE, a rock cut stupa at Sri Surya Pahar has been dated to 200 BCE contemporary with rock cut Karle and Bhaja caves of Maharashtra. Samudragupta's 4th-century-CE Allahabad pillar inscription mentions Kamarupa and Davaka (Central Assam) as frontier kingdoms of the Gupta Empire. Davaka was later absorbed by Kamarupa, which grew into a large kingdom that spanned from Karatoya river to near present Sadiya and covered the entire Brahmaputra valley, North Bengal, parts of Bangladesh and, at times Purnea and parts of West Bengal. The kingdom was ruled by three dynasties who traced their lineage from a mleccha or Kirata Naraka; the Varmanas (c. 350–650 CE), the Mlechchha dynasty (c.655–900 CE) and the Kamarupa-Palas (c. 900–1100 CE), from their capitals in present-day Guwahati (Pragjyotishpura), Tezpur (Haruppeswara) and North Gauhati (Durjaya) respectively. All three dynasties claimed descent from Narakasura. In the reign of the Varman king, Bhaskaravarman (c. 600–650 CE), the Chinese traveller Xuanzang visited the region and recorded his travels. Later, after weakening and disintegration (after the Kamarupa-Palas), the Kamarupa tradition was extended to c. 1255 CE by the Lunar I (c. 1120–1185 CE) and Lunar II (c. 1155–1255 CE) dynasties.

Medieval era 

The Medieval Assam history may have started with the advent of Ahoms in the early part of the 13th century and covers their entire rule of 600 years till 1826. The medieval history of Assam is especially known for its conflict with Muslim powers under Turko-Afghan and Mughals, finally resulting in Assamese victory, however, this military glory was shattered in the early 19th century when it failed to resist the Burmese invasions, which led to its annexation.

Chutia, a Bodo-Kachari group by origin, held the regions on both the banks of Brahmaputra with its domain in the area eastwards from Vishwanath (north bank) and Buridihing (south bank), in Upper Assam and in the state of Arunachal Pradesh. It was  annexed by the Ahoms in the year 1524. The rivalry between the Chutias and Ahoms for the supremacy of eastern Assam led to a series of conflicts between them from the early 16th century.

The Dimasa, another Bodo-Kachari dynasty, (13th century–1854) ruled from Dikhow River to central and southern Assam and had their capital at Dimapur. With the expansion of Ahom kingdom, by the early 17th century, the Chutia areas were annexed and since c. 1536 the Kacharis remained only in Cachar and North Cachar, and more as an Ahom ally than a competing force.

Ahom kingdom

Early Period 

The Ahoms, a Tai group, ruled Upper Assam. In 1228 the Ahoms came to the Brahmaputra Valley under the leadership of Sukapha accompanied with 9,000 men from Mong-Mao,  a Tai state, situated in South-Western Yunnan of China, and established his kingdom upper Assam. In 1253 he founded the capital city in a hillock and named it Charaideo. At that time of Sukapha advent, the area was inhabited by Morans and Barahis, to the north and the north-east was the Chutia kingdom and on the south was the  Kachari kingdom and on the west on the plains were the Bhuyans.

For more than two and a half centuries, the Sukapha and his successors, although mainly concentrated on the organization of the kingdom, they maintained their military superiority in the valley.

Expansion 

The reign of Suhungmung was marked with the first massive expansion of Ahom kingdom. Besides sending a punitive expeditions against the Nagas, they fought numerous battles with the Bhuyans, Chutias, Kacharis,  Turko-Afghans, and the Naras. In 1522-23 the Chutia Kingdom was annexed and the captured tract was placed under the administration of Sadiya-Khowa-Gohain. After securing the eastern tract, Suhunmung than expanded his kingdom westwards through wars and extended till Marangi to the west of the Dhansiri and when the Kacharis tried to regain the lost territory but were defeated and their capital Dimapur was sacked. Over the remaining part of the Kachari kingdom, a new king Detsung was placed as a tributary, but Detsung was not loyal and revolted, and he was killed. Later some time, a new king was sat on the Kachari throne with the name of Nirbhaynarayan. Since then the Kachari kings were regarded as ‘thapita sanchita’ meaning - established and maintained by the Ahom rulers.

Suhunmung reign also witnessed the first Muslim-invasions. After a series of battle, the invaders were defeated and were chased up to Karatoya River. The Sultan of Bengal, terrified, made peace by offering his two daughters and five paraganas, along with other articles as dowry. That's when the rising Koch king Biswa Singha offered submission, and the Ahom general Ton-Kham gave him all the territories that were received as dowry from the Sultan of Bengal on the condition of annual tribute.

The successors of Suhunmung, Suklenmung and Sukhaamphaa, send many expeditions against the Bhuyans and Nagas. But were significant with the wars with the Koch. During the reign of Sukhaamphaa, the Ahoms lost to koch army led by Chilarai and the Ahoms had to accept Koch supremacy and had to give up the tracts of north of Brahmaputra. However, the lost tract was soon recovered with several stern steps.

Later Period

War with Mughals 

Soon after the death of Nara Narayan his kingdom, got divided between the sons of Nara Narayan and Chilarai as Koch Hajo and Koch Bihar. In 1609, Laxmi Narayan king of Cooch Behar accepted the vassalage of Mughals, and the Koch Hajo king Raghudev and later his son Parikshit sought assistance from Ahoms. In 1612, the Mughals attacked Koch Hajo and his territory upto Barnadi River were annexed in the Mughal domain. This brought the Mughals with direct contact with Ahoms. Meanwhile, Parikshit was trying to renew his friendship with Ahoms, but got captured, and died on his way to his kingdom. Later Balinarayan, a brother of Parikshit who had taken refugee under the Ahoms was made the king of Darrang in 1615 by the Ahom king Pratap Singha. From 1616, onwards many battles were fought the Mughal without any tangible result, with the first Battle of Samdhara till after the last battle where the treaty was concluded in 1639  which fixed the Asurar ali on the south bank and the Barnadi on the north bank of the Brahmaputra as the boundary between the two.
Pratap Singha had also enacted the Paik system and created a number of army and civil administration posts such as the Borbarua and Borphukan.

Jayadhwaj Singha taking the advantage of War of succession between the sons of Shah Jahan, occupied the impeial territories upto Dhaka.  Aurangzeb after becoming the emperor, appointed Mir Jumla II, to recover the lost territory. After fail negotiations. In november 1661, Mir Jumla proceeded with a huge army and fleet to invade Ahom kingdom. Here the Ahoms, lost at several places, and then captured the Ahom capital Garhgaon. During the rainy season Mir Jumla and his army suffered immeasurable hardship due to the climatic condition of the valley in addition the guerilla fighting resorted against the invaders. And at last no noticeable gain, negotiation started and in January, 1663,  Treaty of Ghilajharighat was concluded. According to the treaty, the Ahoms had to acknowledging Mughal supremacy, ceded the territory west of the Bharali on the north bank and the Kalang on the south bank along with a huge amount of war indemnity and handing over the sons of the Gohains as hostage and two Ahom princesses to the Mughal harem.

Soon after the departure of Mir Jumla, Jayadhwaj Singha died and the new king Chakradhwaj Singha began preparations to overthrow Mughal supremacy and to recover the lost territory. After numerous battles, finally after the Battle of Saraighat the Mughals were forced to retreat.

The peiord after 1671 was very unstable due to the rivalry among the nobles, who wanted to arrest their own political power and influence by placing their own choice of prince in the throne. In 1679, Laluksola Borphukan, in hopes of becoming king with the help of Mughals, surrendered Guwahati without any battle. But after the accesion of Gadadhar Singha, fought the final Battle of Itakhuli where the Mughals were badly defeated. And the since than the border was fixed at Manah on the north bank and the Nagarbera hill on the south bank of the Brahmaputra till its  annexation by the East India Company in 1826.

18th Century 

Rudra Singha succeeded Gadadhar Singha, his reign is notable because of his military achivements and his socio-culture contributions. He had both subjugated the Kachari and Jaintia kingdoms, and had captured their kings and forced to accept Ahom suzerainty and agreed them to pay annual tribute. Other than that, several expeditions were sent against the Miris, the Daflas, the Naga Mishmis and the Nagas of Namsung, Dayang and the Rengma Nagas during late 17th century and early 18th century. Rudra Singha had made extensive preparations for his invasion of Bengal but remained unfulfilled due to his sudden death in 1714.

After Rudra Singha, the Ahoms achieved no notable military achievement. During this period from, Siva Singha to Rajeswar Singha, the kingdom witnessed peace and prosperity and was significant for constructive activities and other development. In the field of religion also, Ekasarana Dharma spread all over the kingdom and started to influence all aspects of people's life. The religious heads of Vaisnavite monastery exalted great influence with royal patronage and established numerous Satras and most of the people became their disciples. So got the Ahom court greatly came under the influence of Sakta Brahman priests and astrologers. The religious policies concluded by Phuleshwari and the persecutions of unfavored Satras, embroiled the situation more along with the pressure of Paik system in the 18th century.

This finally resulted in the Moamoria rebellion starting from 1769 to 1805, which greatly weakened the Ahom kingdom where the country was greatly depopulated and unorganized. The political rivalry between the nobles made a pathway for the Burmese to invade and weakened it more and finally leading to its annexation.

Colonial era 

The discovery of Camellia sinensis in 1834 in Assam was followed by testing in 1836–37 in London. The British allowed companies to rent land from 1839 onwards. Thereafter tea plantations proliferated in Eastern Assam, where the soil and the climate were most suitable. Problems with the imported Han Chinese labourers from China and hostility from native Assamese resulted in the migration of forced labourers from central and eastern parts of India. After initial trial and error with planting the Chinese and the Assamese-Chinese hybrid varieties, the planters later accepted the local Camellia assamica as the most suitable variety for Assam. By the 1850s, the industry started seeing some profits. The industry saw initial growth, when in 1861, investors were allowed to own land in Assam and it saw substantial progress with the invention of new technologies and machinery for preparing processed tea during the 1870s.

Despite the commercial success, tea labourers continued to be exploited, working and living under poor conditions. Fearful of greater government interference, the tea growers formed the Indian Tea Association in 1888 to lobby to retain the status quo. The organisation was successful in this, but even after India's independence, conditions of the labourers have improved very little.

In the later part of the 18th century, religious tensions and atrocities by the nobles led to the Moamoria rebellion (1769–1805), resulting in tremendous casualties of lives and property. The rebellion was suppressed but the kingdom was severely weakened by the civil war. Political rivalry between Prime Minister Purnananda Burhagohain and Badan Chandra Borphukan, the Ahom Viceroy of Western Assam, led to an invitation to the Burmese by the latter, in turn leading to three successive Burmese invasions of Assam. The reigning monarch Chandrakanta Singha tried to check the Burmese invaders but he was defeated after fierce resistance. And Ahom occupied Assam was captured by the Burmese.

A reign of terror was unleashed by the Burmese on the Assamese people, who fled to neighbouring kingdoms and British-ruled Bengal. The Burmese reached the East India Company's borders, and the First Anglo-Burmese War ensued in 1824. The war ended under the Treaty of Yandabo in 1826, with the Company taking control of Western Assam and installing Purandar Singha as king of Upper Assam in 1833. The arrangement lasted until 1838 and thereafter the British gradually annexed the entire region. Thereafter the court language and medium of instruction in educational institutions of Assam was made Bengali, instead of Assamese. Starting from 1836 until 1873, this imposition of a foreign tongue created greater unemployment among the People of Assam and Assamese literature naturally suffered in its growth.

Initially, Assam was made a part of the Bengal Presidency, then in 1906 it was made a part of Eastern Bengal and Assam province, and in 1912 it was reconstituted into a chief commissioners' province. In 1913, a legislative council and, in 1937, the Assam Legislative Assembly, were formed in Shillong, the erstwhile capital of the region. The British tea planters imported labour from central India adding to the demographic canvas.

The Assam territory was first separated from Bengal in 1874 as the 'North-East Frontier' non-regulation province, also known as the Assam Chief-Commissionership. It was incorporated into the new province of Eastern Bengal and Assam in 1905 after the partition of Bengal (1905–1911) and re-established in 1912 as Assam Province.

After a few initially unsuccessful attempts to gain independence for Assam during the 1850s, anti-colonial Assamese joined and actively supported the Indian National Congress against the British from the early 20th century, with Gopinath Bordoloi emerging as the preeminent nationalist leader in the Assam Congress. Bordoloi's major political rival in this time was Sir Saidullah, who was representing the Muslim League, and had the backing of the influential Muslim cleric Maulana Bhasani.

The Assam Postage Circle was established by 1873 under the headship of the Deputy Post Master General.

At the turn of the 20th century, British India consisted of eight provinces that were administered either by a governor or a lieutenant-governor. Assam Province was one among the major eight provinces of British India. The table below shows the major original provinces during British India covering the Assam Province under the Administrative Office of the Chief Commissioner.

With the partition of India in 1947, Assam became a constituent state of India. The Sylhet District of Assam (excluding the Karimganj subdivision) was given up to East Pakistan, which later became Bangladesh.

Modern history 

The government of India, which has the unilateral powers to change the borders of a state, divided Assam into several states beginning in 1970 within the borders of what was then Assam. In 1963, the Naga Hills district became the 16th state of India under the name of Nagaland. Part of Tuensang was added to Nagaland. In 1970, in response to the demands of the Khasi, Jaintia and Garo people of the Meghalaya Plateau, the districts containing the Khasi Hills, Jaintia Hills, and Garo Hills were formed into an autonomous state within Assam; in 1972 this became a separate state under the name of Meghalaya. In 1972, Arunachal Pradesh (the North East Frontier Agency) and Mizoram (from the Mizo Hills in the south) were separated from Assam as union territories; both became states in 1986.

Since the restructuring of Assam after independence, communal tensions and violence remain. Separatist groups began forming along ethnic lines, and demands for autonomy and sovereignty grew, resulting in the fragmentation of Assam. In 1961, the government of Assam passed legislation making use of the Assamese language compulsory. It was withdrawn later under pressure from Bengali speaking people in Cachar. In the 1980s the Brahmaputra valley saw a six-year Assam Agitation triggered by the discovery of a sudden rise in registered voters on electoral rolls. It tried to force the government to identify and deport foreigners illegally migrating from neighbouring Bangladesh and to provide constitutional, legislative, administrative and cultural safeguards for the indigenous Assamese majority, which they felt was under threat due to the increase of migration from Bangladesh. The agitation ended after an accord (Assam Accord 1985) between its leaders and the Union Government, which remained unimplemented, causing simmering discontent.

The post 1970s experienced the growth of armed separatist groups such as the United Liberation Front of Asom (ULFA) and the National Democratic Front of Bodoland (NDFB). In November 1990, the Government of India deployed the Indian army, after which low-intensity military conflicts and political homicides have been continuing for more than a decade. In recent times, ethnically based militant groups have grown. The Panchayati Raj Act has been applied in Assam, after agitation of the communities due to the sluggish rate of development and general apathy of successive state governments towards Indigenous Assamese communities.

Deadly floods hit the state in 2020 and 2022.

Geography 

A significant geographical aspect of Assam is that it contains three of six physiographic divisions of India – The Northern Himalayas (Eastern Hills), The Northern Plains (Brahmaputra plain) and Deccan Plateau (Karbi Anglong). As the Brahmaputra flows in Assam the climate here is cold and there is rainfall most of the month. Geomorphic studies conclude that the Brahmaputra, the life-line of Assam, is an antecedent river older than the Himalayas, which has entrenched itself since they started rising. The river with steep gorges and rapids in Arunachal Pradesh entering Assam, becomes a braided river (at times 10 mi/16 km wide) and with tributaries, creates a flood plain (Brahmaputra Valley: 50–60 mi/80–100 km wide, 600 mi/1000 km long). The hills of Karbi Anglong, North Cachar and those in and close to Guwahati (also Khasi-Garo Hills) now eroded and dissected are originally parts of the South Indian Plateau system. In the south, the Barak originating in the Barail Range (Assam-Nagaland border) flows through the Cachar district with a 25–30 miles (40–50 km) wide valley and enters Bangladesh with the name Surma River.

Urban centres include Guwahati, one of the 100 fastest growing cities in the world. Guwahati is also referred to as the "Gateway to the North-East India". Silchar, (in the Barak valley) is the second most populous city in Assam and an important centre of business. Other large cities include Dibrugarh, an oil and natural gas industry centre,

Climate 
With the tropical monsoon climate, Assam is temperate (summer max. at 95–100 °F or 35–38 °C and winter min. at 43–46 °F or 6–8 °C) and experiences heavy rainfall and high humidity. The climate is characterised by heavy monsoon downpours reducing summer temperatures and affecting foggy nights and mornings in winters, frequent during the afternoons. Spring (March–April) and autumn (September–October) are usually pleasant with moderate rainfall and temperature. Assam's agriculture usually depends on the south-west monsoon rains.

Flooding 

Every year, flooding from the Brahmaputra and other rivers such as Barak River etc. deluges places in Assam. The water levels of the rivers rise because of rainfall resulting in the rivers overflowing their banks and engulfing nearby areas. Apart from houses and livestock being washed away by flood water, bridges, railway tracks, and roads are also damaged by the calamity, which causes communication breakdown in many places. Fatalities are also caused by the natural disaster in many places of the State.

Fauna 

Assam is one of the richest biodiversity zones in the world and consists of tropical rainforests, deciduous forests, riverine grasslands, bamboo orchards and numerous wetland ecosystems; Many are now protected as national parks and reserved forests.

Assam has wildlife sanctuaries, the most prominent of which are two UNESCO World Heritage Sites-the Kaziranga National Park, on the bank of the Brahmaputra River, and the Manas Wildlife Sanctuary, near the border with Bhutan. The Kaziranga is a refuge for the fast-disappearing Indian one-horned rhinoceros. The state is the last refuge for numerous other endangered and threatened species including the white-winged wood duck or deohanh, Bengal florican, black-breasted parrotbill, red-headed vulture, white-rumped vulture, greater adjutant, Jerdon's babbler, rufous-necked hornbill, Bengal tiger, Asian elephant, pygmy hog, gaur, wild water buffalo, Indian hog deer, hoolock gibbon, golden langur, capped langur, barasingha, Ganges river dolphin, Barca snakehead, Ganges shark, Burmese python, brahminy river turtle, black pond turtle, Asian forest tortoise, and Assam roofed turtle. Threatened species that are extinct in Assam include the gharial, a critically endangered fish-eating crocodilian, and the pink-headed duck (which may be extinct worldwide). For the state bird, the white-winged wood duck, Assam is a globally important area. In addition to the above, there are three other National Parks in Assam namely Dibru Saikhowa National Park, Nameri National Park and the Orang National Park.

Assam has conserved the one-horned Indian rhinoceros from near extinction, along with the pygmy hog, tiger and numerous species of birds, and it provides one of the last wild habitats for the Asian elephant. Kaziranga and Manas are both World Heritage Sites. The state contains Sal tree forests and forest products, much depleted from earlier times. A land of high rainfall, Assam displays greenery. The Brahmaputra River tributaries and oxbow lakes provide the region with hydro-geomorphic environment.

The state has the largest population of the wild water buffalo in the world.
The state has the highest diversity of birds in India with around 820 species. With subspecies the number is as high as 946.
The mammal diversity in the state is around 190 species.

Flora 
Assam is remarkably rich in Orchid species and the Foxtail orchid is the state flower of Assam. The recently established Kaziranga National Orchid and Biodiversity Park boasts more than 500 of the estimated 1,314 orchid species found in India.

Geology 
Assam has petroleum, natural gas, coal, limestone and other minor minerals such as magnetic quartzite, kaolin, sillimanites, clay and feldspar. A small quantity of iron ore is available in western districts. Discovered in 1889, all the major petroleum-gas reserves are in Upper parts.

The region is prone to natural disasters like annual floods and frequent mild earthquakes. Strong earthquakes were recorded in 1869, 1897, and 1950.

Demographics

Population 

The total population of Assam was 26.66 million with 4.91 million households in 2001. Higher population concentration was recorded in the districts of Kamrup, Nagaon, Sonitpur, Barpeta, Dhubri, Darrang, and Cachar. Assam's population was estimated at 28.67 million in 2006 and at 30.57 million in 2011
and is expected to reach 34.18  million by 2021 and 35.60 million by 2026.

As per the 2011 census, the total population of Assam was 31,169,272. The total population of the state has increased from 26,638,407 to 31,169,272 in the last ten years with a growth rate of 16.93%.

Of the 33 districts, eight districts registered a rise in the decadal population growth rate. Religious minority-dominated districts like Dhubri, Goalpara, Barpeta, Morigaon, Nagaon, and Hailakandi, recorded growth rates ranging from 20 per cent to 24 per cent during the last decade. Eastern Assamese districts, including Sivasagar and Jorhat, registered around 9 per cent population growth. These districts do not have any international border.

In 2011, the literacy rate in the state was 73.18%. The male literacy rate was 78.81% and the female literacy rate was 67.27%. In 2001, the census had recorded literacy in Assam at 63.3% with male literacy at 71.3% and female at 54.6%. The urbanisation rate was recorded at 12.9%.

The growth of population in Assam has increased since the middle decades of the 20th century. The population grew from 3.29 million in 1901 to 6.70 million in 1941. It increased to 14.63 million in 1971 and 22.41 million in 1991. The growth in the Western districts and Southern districts was high primarily due to the influx of people from East Pakistan, now Bangladesh.

The mistrust and clashes between indigenous Assamese people and Bengali Muslims started as early as 1952, but is rooted in anti Bengali sentiments of the 1940s. At least 77 people died and 400,000 people were displaced in the 2012 Assam violence between indigenous Bodos and Bengali Muslims.

The People of India project has studied 115 of the ethnic groups in Assam. 79 (69%) identify themselves regionally, 22 (19%) locally, and 3 trans-nationally. The earliest settlers were Austroasiatic, Dravidian followed by Tibeto-Burman, Indo-Aryan, and Tai–Kadai people. Forty-five languages are spoken by different communities, including three major language families: Austroasiatic (5), Sino-Tibetan (24) and Indo-European (12). Three of the spoken languages do not fall in these families. There is a high degree of bilingualism.

Religions 

According to the 2011 census, 61.47% were Hindus, 34.22% were Muslims. Christian minorities (3.7%) are found among the Scheduled Tribe and Castes population. The Scheduled Tribe population in Assam is around 13%, of which Bodos account for 40%. Other religions followed include Jainism (0.1%), Buddhism (0.2%), Sikhism (0.1%) and Animism (amongst Khamti, Phake, Aiton etc. communities).

The three popular sects of Hinduism namely, Saivisim, Saktism and Vaishnavism are prevalent here. Ekasarana Dharma (Neo-Vaisnavite movement) under the leadership of Srimanta Sankardev and his many prominent disciples, gained wonderful momentum in Assam. Many Assamese Hindus are followers of the Ekasarana Dharma sect of Hinduism, which gave rise to Namghar, designed to be simpler places of worship than traditional Hindu temples.

Out of 32 districts of Assam, 9 are Muslim majority according to the 2011 census of India. The districts are Dhubri, Goalpara, Barpeta, Morigaon, Nagaon, Karimganj, Hailakandi, Darrang and Bongaigaon.

Languages 

Assamese and Bodo are the official languages of the state, while Bengali is official in the three districts of Barak Valley, where Sylheti is most commonly spoken.

According to the language census of 2011 in Assam, out of a total population of around 31 million, Assamese is spoken by more than 22 million total speakers, with more than 15 million people speaking it as their mother tongue and around 7 million as L2 speakers. Although the number of speakers is growing, the percentage of Assam's population who have it as a mother tongue has fallen slightly. Assamese serves as lingua franca of the region as it is spoken by over 71% of the population (including the one who have listed Assamese as their 2nd language, while 48.38% of them speak it as their mother tongue. According to the 24th Edition of Ethnologue: Languages of the World, Assamese is spoken by 15,327,990 persons as mother tongue across the world as of 2021. However, 2016 Assam Legislative Assembly election results, have found that 10 million people speaks Assamese as their mother tongue in Assam, which is significantly fewer than the census result of 2011. Furthermore, the Assamese speakers constituted 48% of the State population according to the 2011 Census, and it is predicted that by 2021 Census (currently under way) will reveal the percentage to dip lower below 40%.

The various Bengali dialects and closely related languages are spoken by around 9 million people in Assam, and the portion of the population that speaks these languages has grown slightly as per the census. However, the number of Bengali speakers is estimated to be more than the expected census results, as out of 35% Muslim population in Assam as per 2011 census, it is being reported that 30% or say 10 million of them speaks different dialects of Bengali as their native language but during census enumeration, they (Miya people) have reported their mother tongue as Assamese. Assam  also has a large number of Bengali Hindu population as according to government data, It is being reported that 7.5 million Bengali Hindus live in Assam, thus constituting 25% of the state population as per 2011 census report. Bodo is the third most-spoken language followed by Hindi which comes under fourth position.

The population of the Brahmaputra Valley is 27,580,977 according to the 2011 census report by the Assam government. Assamese is the official language of the Brahmaputra Valley and is spoken by 15 million people comprising 55.65% of the valley population. Bengali is spoken by 6.09 million people representing 22.1% of the valley, Hindi is spoken by 2.1 million comprising 7.61% of the region, Bodo is spoken by 1.41 million comprising 5.13% of the valley's population and 2.98 million people speak various indigenous tribal languages of Assam, such as Santali, Karbi, Tiwa (Lalung), Hmar, Deori, Rabha, Mishing, Koch, Rajbangshi, Sadri, Garo, Dimasa, Gondi, Savara, Gorkha, Halam, Ao and Motak.

Traditionally, Assamese was the language of the common folk in the ancient Kamarupa kingdom and in the medieval kingdoms of Dimasa Kachari, Chutiya Kachari, Borahi Kachari, Ahom and Kamata kingdoms. Traces of the language are found in many poems by Luipa, Sarahapa, and others, in Charyapada (c. 7th–8th century CE). Modern dialects such as Kamrupi and Goalpariya are remnants of this language. Moreover, Assamese in its traditional form was used by the ethno-cultural groups in the region as lingua-franca, which spread during the stronger kingdoms and was required for economic integration. Localised forms of the language still exist in Nagaland and Arunachal Pradesh.

Linguistically modern Assamese traces its roots to the version developed by the American Missionaries based on the local form used near Sivasagar (Xiwôxagôr) district. Assamese (Ôxômiya) is a rich language due to its hybrid nature and unique characteristics of pronunciation and softness. The presence of Voiceless velar fricative in Assamese makes it a unique among other similar Indo-Aryan languages.

Bodo is an ancient language of Assam. Spatial distribution patterns of the ethno-cultural groups, cultural traits and the phenomenon of naming all the major rivers in the North East Region with Bodo-Kachari words (e.g. Dihing, Dibru, Dihong, D/Tista, and Dikrai) reveal that it was more widely-spoken in ancient times. Bodo is now spoken largely in the Western Assam. It is official language of the Bodoland territorial region and co-official language of the state of Assam. It is also one of twenty-two languages listed in the Eighth Schedule of the Constitution of India. After years of neglect, now Bodo language is getting attention and its literature is developing. Other native languages of Tibeto-Burman origin and related to Bodo-Kachari are Deori, Mising, Karbi, Rabha, and Tiwa.

There are approximately 590,000 Nepali speakers spread all over the state forming about 1.98% of Assam's total population according to 2011 census.

There are speakers of Tai languages in Assam. A total of six Tai languages were spoken in Assam. Two are now extinct.
 Tai Phake
 Tai Aiton
 Khamti
 Khamyang (critically endangered)
 Ahom (extinct)
 Turung (extinct)

Government and politics 

Assam has Governor Jagdish Mukhi as the head of the state, the unicameral Assam Legislative Assembly of 126 members, and a government led by the Chief Minister of Assam. The state is divided into five regional divisions.

On 19 May 2016, BJP under the leadership of Sarbananda Sonowal won the Assembly elections, thus forming the first BJP-led government in Assam.

Administrative districts 

The 31 administrative districts of Assam are delineated based on geographic features such as rivers, hills, and forests.

On 15 August 2015, five new districts were formed:
 Part of Sonitpur became the Biswanath district (9 in the nearby map)
 Part of Sivasagar became the Charaideo district (4)
 Part of Nagaon became the Hojai district (14)
 Part of Dhubri became the South Salmara-Mankachar district (33)
 The Karbi Anglong district was divided into East (11) and West (15) districts

On 27 June 2016, an island in the Brahmaputra River was removed from the Jorhat district and declared the Majuli district, India's first district that is a river island.

On 12 January 2021 Bajali has been curves out from Barpeta district and formally declared as a district. With the announcement made by Governor Jagdish Mukhi, it has become the 34th district of Assam.

On 31 December 2022, existing four districts Bajali(with Barpeta), Tamulpur(with Udalguri), Biswanath (with Sonitpur) and Hojai(with Nagaon) and number of district came down to 31.

Subdivisions 
The administrative districts are further subdivided into 54 "Subdivisions" or Mahakuma. Every district is administered from a district headquarters with the office of the Deputy Commissioner, District Magistrate, Office of the District Panchayat and usually with a district court.

The local governance system is organised under the jila-parishad (District Panchayat) for a district, panchayat for group of or individual rural areas and under the urban local bodies for the towns and cities. There are now 2489 village panchayats covering 26247 villages in Assam. The 'town-committee' or nagar-somiti for small towns, 'municipal board' or pouro-sobha for medium towns and municipal corporation or pouro-nigom for the cities consist of the urban local bodies.

For revenue purposes, the districts are divided into revenue circles and mouzas; for the development projects, the districts are divided into 219 'development-blocks' and for law and order these are divided into 206 police stations or thana.

Guwahati is the largest metropolitan area and urban conglomeration administered under the highest form of urban local body – Guwahati Municipal Corporation in Assam. All other urban centres are managed under Municipal Boards.

A list of 9 oldest, classified and prominent, and constantly inhabited, recognised urban centres based on the earliest years of formation of the civic bodies, before the Indian independence of 1947 is tabulated below:

Autonomous Council 
The state has three autonomous councils.
Bodoland Autonomous Territorial Council
Karbi Anglong Autonomous Council 
Dima Hasao Autonomous Council.

The state has further more 12 statutory autonomous council – 
 Tiwa(Lalung) Autonomous Council for ethnic Tiwa people (also known as Lalung people)
 Rabha Hasong Autonomous Council
 Moran Autonomous Council for Moran people
Dudhnoi for ethnic Rabha Kachari 
 Mising Autonomous Council for Mising people 
 Matak Autonomous Council for Matak people 
 Kamatapur Autonomous Council for Rajbongshi people, 
 Bodo Kachari Welfare Autonomous Council for Bodo-Kachari people living outside the Bodoland Territorial Region
 Sonowal Kachari Autonomous Council, Dibrugarh, 
 Thengal Kachari Autonomous Council,
 Titabar and Deori Autonomous Council, 
 Lakhimpur for ethnic Deori Kachari.

Social issues

Inter-state dispute

According to Assam Government, Assam has border dispute with four states namely Mizoram, Meghalaya, Nagaland, Arunachal Pradesh.
 
Assam-Mizoram dispute

Mizoram used to be a district of Assam as Lushai hills before being carved out as a separate union territory and later, becoming another state in 1987. Because of the history, the district's borders did not really matter for locals for a long time. Mizoram shares a border with the districts Cachar, Hailakandi and Karimganj which comes under Barak valley region of Assam.
Over time, the two states started having different perceptions about where the demarcation should be. While Mizoram wants it to be along an Inner Line Permit notified in 1875 to protect tribals from outside influence, which Mizos feel is part of their historical homeland, Assam wants it to be demarcated according to district boundaries drawn up much later.

Assam-Meghalaya dispute

Meghalaya has identified close to a dozen areas on which it has a dispute with Assam about the state's borders. The chief ministers of the two states, Himanta Biswa Sarma and Megahalya's Conrad Sangma, recently held the first-ever meeting on inter-state border dispute. Both the states have agreed to individually assess the claims for all 12 areas flagged by Meghalaya in the past. A second round of discussion between the two state CMs will be held next month of August.
On the question of the role the Union Government is playing in redressing the inter-State border dispute in the country, minister of state for home affairs Nityanand Rai said, “The approach of the Central Government has consistently been that inter-state disputes can be resolved only with the cooperation of the State Governments concerned and that the Central Government acts only as a facilitator for amicable settlement of the dispute in the spirit of mutual understanding.”
 
Assam-Nagaland dispute

The border dispute between the two states has been going on since the formation of Nagaland in 1963. The two states lay claim to Merapani, a small village next to the plains of Assam's Golaghat district. There have been reports of violent clashes in the region since the 1960s.

Assam-Arunachal Pradesh dispute

Assam shares an 804.10 km inter-state boundary with Arunachal Pradesh. The state of Arunachal Pradesh, created in 1987, claims some land that traditionally belonged to its residents has been given to Assam. A tripartite committee had recommended that certain territories be transferred from Assam to Arunachal. The two states have since been battling it out in the Supreme court of India over the issue. Some incidents of local violence have been reported from the borders.

Separate statehood demand within Assam
Bodoland

The agitation for the creation of a separate Bodoland state resulted in an agreement between the Indian Government, the Assam state government and the Bodo Liberation Tigers Force. According to the agreement made on 10 February 2003, the Bodoland Territorial Council, an entity subordinate to the government of Assam, was created to govern four districts covering 3082 Bodo Kachari-majority villages in Assam. Elections to the council were held on 13 May 2003, and Hagrama Mohilary was sworn in as the chief of the 46-member council on 4 June. Demographic wise, the Indigenous Bodo tribe constitutes half of the region's population, along with the region have also significant large number of other  ethnic minorities which includes: Assamese, Koch Rajbangshi, Garo, Rabha tribe, Adivasis, Nepalis, Tea tribes, Bengalis, Biharis, Marwaris and Muslims.

Karbi Anglong

Karbi Anglong is one of the 35 districts of Assam. Karbi Anglong was previously known as Mikir Hills. It was part of the Excluded Areas and Partially Excluded Areas (the present North East India) in British India. The British Indian government had never included this area under their government's jurisdiction. Thereby, no government development work or activity were done, nor any tax levied from the hills including Karbi Anglong. The first memorandum for a Karbi homeland was presented to Governor Reid on 28 October 1940 by Semsonsing Ingti and Khorsing Terang at Mohongdijua. The Karbi leaders were then, a part of the All Party Hill Leaders' Conference (APHLC) which was formed on 6 July 1960. The movement again gained momentum when the Karbi Anglong District Council passed a resolution demanding a Separate State in 1981. Then again from 1986 through the leadership of Autonomous State Demand Committee (ASDC), demanded Autonomous statehood of Karbi Anglong and Dima Hasao under Article 244(A). In 2002, the Karbi Anglong Autonomous Council passed another resolution to press for the demand of statehood. Several other memoranda were submitted at different times by several organisations. The demand for a separate state turned violent on 31 July 2013 when student demonstrators set government buildings on fire. Following the incident, the elected leaders of Karbi Anglong jointly submitted a memorandum to the Prime Minister of India demanding a separate State. Demographic wise, more than half of the Karbi Anglong population is made up of Indigenous Karbi tribe with significant migrants from other parts of India.

Dimaraji

The Dimasa people of northeast India have been demanding a separate state called Dimaraji or "Dimaland" for several decades. It would comprise the Dimasa-Kachari inhabited areas, namely Dima Hasao district, Cachar district, parts of Barak Valley, Nagaon district, Hojai district and Karbi Anglong district in Assam together with part of Dimapur district in Nagaland.

Barak state

Bengalis first came into Assam's Brahmaputra valley in 19th century A.D as per as various credible sources. The Barak Valley of Assam comprising the present districts of Cachar, Karimganj and Hailakandi is contiguous to Sylhet (Bengal plains), where the Bengali Hindus, according to historian J.B. Bhattacharjee, had settled well before the colonial period, influencing the culture of Dimasa Kacaharis. Bhattacharjee describes that the Dimasa kings spoke Bengali and the inscriptions and coins written were in Bengali script. Migrations to Cachar increased after the British annexation of the region. 
The native Bengali people of Assam demanded separate state for themselves within the Bengali majority areas of Assam particularly Bengali majority Barak valley comprising three districts: Cachar, Hailakandi, Karimganj along with Dima Hasao and Lumding was also demanded to meet the criteria for creating a separate state for themselves by carving out from Assam's Assamese majority Brahmaputra valley post NRC. Silchar is the proposed capital of Barak state. Barak valley is the most neglected part of Assam in terms of its infrastructure development, tourism sector, educational institutions, hospitals, IT industries, G.D.P, H.D.I etc. which is still lagging behind in comparison to the Assam's mainland Brahmaputra valley which have access to all of those facilities mentioned above. In fact, the southern Assam have an overall indigenous Bengali majority population particularly Lumding have (95%) Bengali majority, Barak Valley region have an overwhelming Bengali majority of about (80.3%), while Dima Hasao have approximately (30.2%) significant Bengali plurality on certain pockets specially in the urban areas of the district.

Migration from Bangladesh
Assam has been a major site of migration since the Partition of the subcontinent, with the first wave being composed largely of Bengali Hindu refugees arriving during and shortly after the establishment of India and Pakistan (current day Bangladesh was originally part of Pakistan, known as East Pakistan) in 1947–1951. Between the period of first patches (1946-1951), around 274,455 Bengali Hindu refugees have arrived from what is now called Bangladesh (former East Pakistan) in various locations of Assam as permanent settlers and again in second patches between (1952-1958) of the same decade, around 212,545 Bengali Hindus from Bangladesh took shelter in various parts of the state permanently. After the 1964 East Pakistan riots many Bengali Hindus have poured into Assam as refugees and the number of Hindu migrants in the state rose to 1,068,455 in 1968 (sharply after 4 years of the riot). The fourth patches numbering around 347,555 have just arrived after Bangladesh liberation war of 1971 as refugees and most of them being Bengali speaking Hindus have decided to stay back in Assam permanently afterwards. Though the governments of India and Bangladesh made agreements for the repatriation of certain groups of refugees after the second and third waves, a large presence of refugees and other migrants and their descendants remained in the state. Nevertheless, still people of Bangladesh have been immigrating to Assam on regular basis. As per reports, about 635 of Bangladeshi people mostly Hindus, use to immigrate to Assam daily.

Besides migration caused by displacement, there is also a large and continual unregulated movement between Assam and neighboring regions of Bangladesh with an exceptionally porous border. The situation is called a risk to Assam's as well as India's security. The continual illegal entry of people into Assam, mostly from Bangladesh, has caused economic upheaval and social and political unrest. During the Assam Movement (1979–1985), the All Assam Students Union (AASU) and others demanded that government stop the influx of immigrants and deport those who had already settled. During this period, 855 people (the AASU says 860) died in various conflicts with migrants and police. The 1983 Illegal Migrants (Determination by Tribunal) Act, applied only to Assam, decreed that any person who entered the Assam after Bangladesh declared independence from Pakistan in 1971 and without authorisation or travel documents is to be considered a foreigner, with the decision on foreigner status to be carried out by designated tribunals. In 1985, the Indian Government and leaders of the agitation signed the Assam accord to settle the conflict.

The 1991 census made the changing demographics of border districts more visible. Since 2010, the Indian Government has undertaken the updating of the National Register of Citizens for Assam, and in 2018 the 32.2 million residents of Assam were subject to a review of their citizenship. In August 2019, India released the names of the 2 million residents of Assam that had been determined to be non-citizens and whose names had therefore been struck off the Register of Citizens, depriving them of rights and making them subject to action, and potentially leaving some of them stateless, and the government has begun deporting non-citizens, while detaining 1,000 others that same year.

In January 2019, the Assam's peasant organisation Krishak Mukti Sangram Samiti (KMSS) claimed that there are around 20 lakh Hindu Bangladeshis in Assam who would become Indian citizens if the Citizenship (Amendment) Bill is passed. BJP, however claimed that only eight lakh Hindu Bangladeshis will get citizenship. According to various sources, the total number of illegal Hindu Bangladeshis is hard to ascertain. According to the census data, the number of Hindu immigrants have been largely exaggerated.

In February 2020, the Assam Minority Development Board announced plans to segregate illegal Bangladeshi Muslim immigrants from the indigenous Muslims of the state, though some have expressed problems in identifying an indigenous Muslim person. According to the board, there are 1.4 crore Muslims in the state, of which 1 crore are of Bangladeshi origin. A report reveals that out of total 33 districts in Assam, Bangladeshis dominate almost 15 districts of Assam.

Floods

In the rainy season every year, the Brahmaputra and other rivers overflow their banks and flood adjacent land. Flood waters wash away property including houses and livestock. Damage to crops and fields harms the agricultural sector. Bridges, railway tracks, and roads are also damaged, harming transportation and communication, and in some years requiring food to be air-dropped to isolated towns. Some deaths are attributed to the floods.

Unemployment
Unemployment is a chronic problem in Assam. It is variously blamed on poor infrastructure, limited connectivity, and government policy; on a "poor work culture"; on failure to advertise vacancies; and on government hiring candidates from outside Assam.

In 2020 a series of violent lynchings occurred in the region.

Education 

Assam schools are run by the Indian government, government of Assam or by private organisations. Medium of instruction is mainly in Assamese, English or Bengali. Most of the schools follow the state's examination board which is called the Secondary Education Board of Assam.  Almost all private schools follow the Central Board for Secondary Education (CBSE), Indian Certificate of Secondary Education (ICSE) and Indian School Certificate (ISC) syllabuses.

Assamese language is the main medium in educational institutions but Bengali language is also taught as a major Indian language. In Guwahati and Digboi, many Jr. basic schools and Jr. high schools are Nepali linguistic and all the teachers are Nepali. Nepali is included by Assam State Secondary Board, Assam Higher Secondary Education Council and Gauhati University in their HSLC, higher secondary and graduation level respectively. In some junior basic and higher secondary schools and colleges, Nepali teachers and lecturers are appointed.

The capital, Dispur, contains institutions of higher education for students of the north-eastern region. Cotton College, Guwahati, dates back to the 19th century. Assam has several institutions for tertiary education and research.

Universities, colleges and institutions include:

Universities 
 Assam University
 Assam Agricultural University, Jorhat
 Assam Don Bosco University,
 Assam down town University,
 Assam Rajiv Gandhi University of Cooperative Management, (ARGUCOM), Sivasagar
 Assam Science and Technology University, Guwahati
 Assam Women's University, Jorhat
 Bodoland University, Kokrajhar
 Cotton University, Guwahati
 Dibrugarh University, Dibrugarh
 Gauhati University, Guwahati
 Kaziranga University, Jorhat
 Krishnaguru Adhyatmik Vishvavidyalaya
 Krishna Kanta Handique State Open University
 Kumar Bhaskar Varma Sanskrit and Ancient Studies University
 Mahapurusha Srimanta Sankaradeva Viswavidyalaya
 National Law University and Judicial Academy, Assam
 Royal Global University
 Srimanta Sankaradeva University of Health Sciences
 Tezpur University, Tezpur

Medical colleges 
 Assam Medical College, Dibrugarh
 Fakhruddin Ali Ahmed Medical College, Barpeta
 Gauhati Medical College and Hospital, Guwahati
 Jorhat Medical College and Hospital, Jorhat
 Regional Dental College, Guwahati
 Silchar Medical College and Hospital, Silchar
 Tezpur Medical College & Hospital, Tezpur

Engineering and technological colleges 
 Indian Institute of Information Technology, Guwahati
 National Institute of Technology, Silchar,
 Assam Engineering College, Guwahati
 Assam Science and Technology University
 Bineswar Brahma Engineering College, Kokrajhar
 Central Institute of Technology, Kokrajhar
 Girijananda Chowdhury Institute of Management and Technology, Guwahati
 Girijananda Chowdhury Institute of Management and Technology, Tezpur
 Indian Institute of Technology in Guwahati
 Institute of Engineering and Technology, Dibrugarh University
 Institute of Science and Technology, Guwahati University
 Jorhat Engineering College, Jorhat
 Jorhat Institute of Science & Technology, Jorhat
 NETES Institute of Technology & Science Mirza, 
 Barak Valley Engineering College Nirala Karimganj
 Golaghat Engineering College Golaghat

Research institutes present in the state include National Research Centre on Pig, (ICAR) in Guwahati,

Economy 

Assam's economy is based on agriculture and oil. Assam produces more than half of India's tea. The Assam-Arakan basin holds about a quarter of the country's oil reserves, and produces about 12% of its total petroleum. According to the recent estimates, Assam's per capita GDP is ₹6,157 at constant prices (1993–94) and ₹10,198 at current prices; almost 40% lower than that in India. According to the recent estimates, per capita income in Assam has reached ₹6756 (1993–94 constant prices) in 2004–05, which is still much lower than India's.

Tea plantations

Macro-economy 
The economy of Assam today represents a unique juxtaposition of backwardness amidst plenty. Despite its rich natural resources, and supplying of up to 25% of India's petroleum needs, Assam's growth rate has not kept pace with that of India; the difference has increased rapidly since the 1970s. The Indian economy grew at 6% per annum over the period of 1981 to 2000; the growth rate of Assam was only 3.3%. In the Sixth Plan period, Assam experienced a negative growth rate of 3.78% when India's was positive at 6%. In the post-liberalised era (after 1991), the difference widened further.

According to recent analysis, Assam's economy is showing signs of improvement. In 2001–02, the economy grew (at 1993–94 constant prices) at 4.5%, falling to 3.4% in the next financial year. During 2003–04 and 2004–05, the economy grew (at 1993–94 constant prices) at 5.5% and 5.3% respectively. The advanced estimates placed the growth rate for 2005–06 at above 6%. Assam's GDP in 2004 is estimated at $13 billion in current prices. Sectoral analysis again exhibits a dismal picture. The average annual growth rate of agriculture, which was 2.6% per annum over the 1980s, has fallen to 1.6% in the 1990s. The manufacturing sector showed some improvement in the 1990s with a growth rate of 3.4% per annum than 2.4% in the 1980s. For the past five decades, the tertiary sector has registered the highest growth rates of the other sectors, which even has slowed down in the 1990s than in the 1980s.

Employment 
Unemployment is one of the major problems in Assam. This problem can be attributed to overpopulation and a faulty education system. Every year, large numbers of students obtain higher academic degrees but because of non-availability of proportional vacancies, most of these students remain unemployed. A number of employers hire over-qualified or efficient, but under-certified, candidates, or candidates with narrowly defined qualifications. The problem is exacerbated by the growth in the number of technical institutes in Assam which increases the unemployed community of the State. Many job-seekers are eligible for jobs in sectors like railways and Oil India but do not get these jobs because of the appointment of candidates from outside of Assam to these posts. The reluctance on the part of the departments concerned to advertise vacancies in vernacular language has also made matters worse for local unemployed youths particularly for the job-seekers of Grade C and D vacancies.

Reduction of the unemployed has been threatened by illegal immigration from Bangladesh. This has increased the workforce without a commensurate increase in jobs. Immigrants compete with local workers for jobs at lower wages, particularly in construction, domestics, Rickshaw-pullers, and vegetable sellers. The government has been identifying (via NRC) and deporting illegal immigrants. Continued immigration is exceeding deportation.

Agriculture 

In Assam among all the productive sectors, agriculture makes the highest contribution to its domestic sectors, accounting for more than a third of Assam's income and employs 69% of workforce. Assam's biggest contribution to the world is Assam tea. It has its own variety, Camellia sinensis var. assamica. The state produces rice, rapeseed, mustard seed, jute, potato, sweet potato, banana, papaya, areca nut, sugarcane and turmeric.

Assam's agriculture is yet to experience modernisation in a real sense. With implications for food security, per capita food grain production has declined in the past five decades. Productivity has increased marginally, but is still low compared to highly productive regions. For instance, the yield of rice (a staple food of Assam) was just 1531 kg per hectare against India's 1927 kg per hectare in 2000–01 (which itself is much lower than Egypt's 9283, US's 7279, South Korea's 6838, Japan's 6635 and China's 6131 kg per hectare in 2001). On the other hand, after having strong domestic demand, and with 1.5 million hectares of inland water bodies, numerous rivers and 165 varieties of fishes, fishing is still in its traditional form and production is not self-sufficient.

Floods in Assam greatly affect the farmers and the families dependent on agriculture because of large-scale damage of agricultural fields and crops by flood water. Every year, flooding from the Brahmaputra and other rivers deluges places in Assam. The water levels of the rivers rise because of rainfall resulting in the rivers overflowing their banks and engulfing nearby areas. Apart from houses and livestock being washed away by flood water, bridges, railway tracks and roads are also damaged by the calamity, which causes communication breakdown in many places. Fatalities are also caused by the natural disaster in many places of the state.

Industry 
Handlooms and handicrafts are traditional industries that continue to survive, especially among rural women, in the state.

Assam's proximity to some neighbouring countries such as Bangladesh, Nepal and Bhutan, benefits its trade. The major Border checkpoints through which border trade flows to Bangladesh from Assam are : Sutarkandi (Karimganj), Dhubri, Mankachar (Dhubri) and Golokanj. To facilitate border trade with Bangladesh, Border Trade Centres have been developed at Sutarkandi and Mankachar. It has been proposed in the 11th five-year plan to set up two more Border Trade Center, one at Ledo connecting China and other at Darrang connecting Bhutan. There are several Land Custom Stations (LCS) in the state bordering Bangladesh and Bhutan to facilitate border trade.

The government of India has identified some thrust areas for industrial development of Assam:

Although, the region in the eastern periphery of India is landlocked and is linked to the mainland by the narrow Siliguri Corridor (or the Chicken's Neck) improved transport infrastructure in all the three modes – rail, road and air – and developing urban infrastructure in the cities and towns of Assam are giving a boost to the entire industrial scene. The Lokpriya Gopinath Bordoloi International Airport at Guwahati, with international flights to Bangkok and Singapore offered by Druk Air of Bhutan, was the 12th busiest airport of India in 2012. The cities of Guwahati in the west and Dibrugarh in the east with good rail, road and air connectivity are the two important nerve centres of Assam, to be selected by Asian Development Bank for providing $200 million for improvement of urban infrastructure.

Assam is a producer of crude oil and it accounts for about 15% of India's crude output, exploited by the Assam Oil Company Ltd., and natural gas in India and is the second place in the world (after Titusville in the United States) where petroleum was discovered. Asia's first successful mechanically drilled oil well was drilled in Makum way back in 1867. Most of the oilfields are located in the Eastern Assam region. Assam has four oil refineries in Digboi (Asia's first and world's second refinery), Guwahati, Bongaigaon and Numaligarh and with a total capacity of 7 million metric tonnes (7.7 million short tons) per annum. Asia's first refinery was set up at Digboi and discoverer of Digboi oilfield was the Assam Railways & Trading Company Limited (AR&T Co. Ltd.), a registered company of London in 1881. One of the biggest public sector oil company of the country Oil India Ltd. has its plant and headquarters at Duliajan.

There are several other industries, including a chemical fertiliser plant at Namrup, petrochemical industries in Namrup and Bongaigaon, paper mills at Jagiroad, Hindustan Paper Corporation Ltd. Township Area Panchgram and Jogighopa, sugar mills in Barua Bamun Gaon, Chargola, Kampur, cement plants in Bokajan and Badarpur, and a cosmetics plant of Hindustan Unilever (HUL) at Doom Dooma. Moreover, there are other industries such as jute mill, textile and yarn mills, Assam silk, and silk mills. Many of these industries are facing losses and closure due to lack of infrastructure and improper management practices.

Tourism 

Wildlife, cultural, and historical destinations have attracted visitors.

Culture 

Assamese Culture is traditionally a hybrid one developed due to assimilation of ethno-cultural groups of Austric, Dravidian, Tibeto-Burman and Tai origin in the past. Therefore, both local elements or the local elements in Sanskritised forms are distinctly found. The major milestones in the evolution of Assamese culture are:

 Assimilation in the Kamarupa Kingdom for almost 700 years (under the Varmans for 300 years, Salastambhas and Palas for each 200 years).
 Establishment of the Chutia kingdom in the 12th century in eastern Assam and assimilation for next 400 years.
 Establishment of the Ahom kingdom in the 13th century CE and assimilation for next 600 years.
 Assimilation in the Koch Kingdom (15th–16th century CE) of western Assam and Kachari Kingdom (12th–18th century CE) of central and southern Assam.
 Vaishnava Movement led by Srimanta Shankardeva (Xongkordeu) and its contribution and cultural changes. The Vaishanava Movement, the 15th century religio-cultural movement under the leadership of Srimanta Sankardeva (Sonkordeu) and his disciples have provided another dimension to Assamese culture. A renewed Hinduisation in local forms took place, which was initially greatly supported by the Koch and later by the Ahom Kingdoms. The resultant social institutions such as namghar and sattra (the Vaishnav Monasteries) have become part of the Assamese way of life. The movement contributed greatly towards language, literature, and performing and fine arts.

The modern culture has been influenced by events in the British and the post-British era. The language was standardised by American Baptist Missionaries such as Nathan Brown, Dr. Miles Bronson and local pundits such as Hemchandra Barua with the form available in the Sibsagar (Sivasagar) District (the ex-nerve centre of the Ahom Kingdom).

Increasing efforts of standardisation in the 20th century alienated the localised forms present in different areas and with the less-assimilated ethno-cultural groups (many source-cultures). However, Assamese culture in its hybrid form and nature is one of the richest, still developing and in true sense is a 'cultural system' with sub-systems. Many source-cultures of the Assamese cultural-system are still surviving either as sub-systems or as sister entities, e.g. the; Bodo or Karbi or Mishing. It is important to keep the broader system closer to its roots and at the same time focus on development of the sub-systems.

Some of the common and unique cultural traits in the region are peoples' respect towards areca-nut and betel leaves, symbolic (gamosa, arnai, etc.), traditional silk garments (e.g. mekhela chador, traditional dress of Assamese women) and towards forefathers and elderly. Moreover, great hospitality and bamboo culture are common.

Symbols 

Symbolism is an ancient cultural practice in Assam and is still a very important part of the Assamese way of life. Various elements are used to represent beliefs, feelings, pride, identity, etc. Tamulpan, Xorai and Gamosa are three important symbolic elements in Assamese culture. Tamulpan (the areca nut and betel leaves) or guapan (gua from kwa) are considered along with the Gamosa (a typical woven cotton or silk cloth with embroidery) as the offers of devotion, respect and friendship. The Tamulpan-tradition is an ancient one and is being followed since time-immemorial with roots in the aboriginal Austric culture. Xorai is a traditionally manufactured bell-metal article of great respect and is used as a container-medium while performing respectful offers. Moreover, symbolically many ethno-cultural groups use specific clothes to portray respect and pride.

There were many other symbolic elements and designs, but are now only found in literature, art, sculpture, architecture, etc. or in use today for only religious purposes. The typical designs of Assamese-lion, dragon, and flying-lion were used for symbolising various purposes and occasions. The archaeological sites such as the Madan Kamdev (c. 9th–10th centuries CE) exhibits mass-scale use of lions, dragon-lions and many other figures of demons to show case power and prosperity. The Vaishnava monasteries and many other architectural sites of the late medieval period display the use of lions and dragons for symbolic effects.

Festivals and traditions 

There are diversified important traditional festivals in Assam. Bihu is the most important and common and celebrated all over Assam. It is the Assamese new year celebrated in April of the Gregorian calendar. Christmas is observed with great merriment by Christians of various denominations, including Catholics and Protestants, throughout Assam. Durga Puja, a festival introduced and popularised by Bengalis, is widely celebrated across the state. Muslims celebrate two Eids (Eid ul-Fitr and Eid al-Adha) with much eagerness all over Assam.

Bihu is a series of three prominent festivals. Primarily a non-religious festival celebrated to mark the seasons and the significant points of a cultivator's life over a yearly cycle. Three Bihus, rongali or bohag, celebrated with the coming of spring and the beginning of the sowing season; kongali or kati, the barren bihu when the fields are lush but the barns are empty; and the bhogali or magh, the thanksgiving when the crops have been harvested and the barns are full. Bihu songs and Bihu dance are associated to rongali bihu. The day before the each bihu is known as 'uruka'. The first day of 'rongali bihu' is called 'Goru bihu' (the bihu of the cows), when the cows are taken to the nearby rivers or ponds to be bathed with special care. In recent times the form and nature of celebration has changed with the growth of urban centres.

Bwisagu is one of the popular seasonal festivals of the Bodos. Bwisagu start of the new year or age. Baisagu is a Boro word which originated from the word "Baisa" which means year or age, and "Agu" that means starting or start.

Beshoma is a festival of Deshi people. It is a celebration of sowing crop. The Beshoma starts on the last day of Chaitra and goes on until the sixth of Baisakh. With varying locations it is also called Bishma or Chait-Boishne.

Bushu Dima or simply Bushu is a major harvest festival of the Dimasa people. This festival is celebrated during the end of January. Officially 27 January has been declared as the day of Bushu Dima festival. The Dimasa people celebrate their festival by playing musical instruments- khram (a type of drum), muri (a kind of huge long flute). The people dances to the different tunes called "murithai" and each dance has got its name, the prominent being the "Baidima" There are three types of Bushu celebrated among the Dimasas Jidap, Surem and Hangsou.

Chavang Kut is a post harvesting festival of the Kuki people. The festival is celebrated on the first day of November every year. Hence, this particular day has been officially declared as a Restricted Holiday by the Assam government. In the past, the celebration was primarily important in the religio-cultural sense. The rhythmic movements of the dances in the festival were inspired by animals, agricultural techniques and showed their relationship with ecology. Today, the celebration witnesses the shifting of stages and is revamped to suit new contexts and interpretations. The traditional dances which form the core of the festival is now performed in out-of-village settings and are staged in a secular public sphere. In Assam, the Kukis mainly reside in the two autonomous districts of Dima Hasao and Karbi Anglong.

Moreover, there are other important traditional festivals being celebrated every year on different occasions at different places. Many of these are celebrated by different ethno-cultural groups (sub and sister cultures). Some of these are:

Other few yearly celebrations are Doul Utsav of Barpeta, Brahmaputra Beach Festival, Guwahati, Kaziranga Elephant Festival, Kaziranga and Dehing Patkai Festival, Lekhapani, Karbi Youth Festival of Diphu and International Jatinga Festival, Jatinga can not be forgotten. Few yearly Mela's like Jonbeel Mela, began in the 15th century by the Ahom Kings, Ambubachi Mela, Guwahati etc.

Lachit Divas' is celebrated to promote the ideals of Lachit Borphukan – the legendary general of Assam's history. Sarbananda Sonowal, the chief minister of Assam took part in the Lachit Divas celebration at the statue of Lachit Borphukan at Brahmaputra riverfront on 24 November 2017.
He said, the first countrywide celebration of 'Lachit Divas' would take place in New Delhi followed by state capitals such as Hyderabad, Bangalore and Kolkata in a phased manner.

Music, dance, and drama 

Performing arts include: Ankia Naat (Onkeeya Naat), a traditional Vaishnav dance-drama (Bhaona) popular since the 15th century CE. It makes use of large masks of gods, goddesses, demons and animals and in between the plays a Sutradhar (Xutrodhar) continues to narrate the story.

Besides Bihu dance and Huchory performed during the Bohag Bihu, dance forms of tribal minorities such as; Kushan nritra of Rajbongshi's, Bagurumba and Bordoicikhla dance of Bodos, Mishing Bihu, Banjar Kekan performed during Chomangkan by Karbis, Jhumair of Tea-garden community are some of the major folk dances. Sattriya (Sotriya) dance related to Vaishnav tradition is a classical form of dance. Moreover, there are several other age-old dance-forms such as Barpeta's Bhortal Nritya, Deodhani Nritya, Ojapali, Beula Dance, Ka Shad Inglong Kardom, Nimso Kerung, etc. The tradition of modern moving theatres is typical of Assam with immense popularity of many Mobile theatre groups such as Kohinoor, Sankardev, Abahan, Bhagyadevi, Hengul, Brindabon, Itihas etc.

The indigenous folk music has influenced the growth of a modern idiom, that finds expression in the music of artists like Jyoti Prasad Agarwala, Bishnuprasad Rabha, Parvati Prasad Baruwa, Bhupen Hazarika, Pratima Barua Pandey, Anima Choudhury, Luit Konwar Rudra Baruah, Jayanta Hazarika, Khagen Mahanta, Dipali Barthakur, Ganashilpi Dilip Sarma, Sudakshina Sarma among many others. Among the new generation, Zubeen Garg, Jitul Sonowal, Angaraag Mahanta and Joi Barua.
There is an award given in the honour of Bishnu Prasad Rabha for achievements in the cultural/music world of Assam by the state government.

Cuisine 

Typically, an Assamese meal consists of many things such as bhat (rice) with dayl/ daly (lentils), masor jool (fish stew), mangxô (meat stew) and stir fried greens or herbs and vegetables.

The two main characteristics of a traditional meal in Assam are khar (an Alkali, named after its main ingredient) and tenga (Preparations bearing a characteristically rich and tangy flavour). Khorika is the smoked or fire grilled meat eaten with meals. Commonly consumed varieties of meat include Mutton, fowl, duck/goose, fish, pigeon, pork and beef (among Muslim and Christian indigenous Assamese ethnic groups). Grasshoppers, locusts, silkworms, snails, eels, wild fowl, squab and other birds, venison are also eaten, albeit in moderation.

Khorisa (fermented bamboo shoots) are used at times to flavour curries while they can also be preserved and made into pickles. Koldil (banana flower) and squash are also used in popular culinary preparations.

A variety of different rice cultivars are grown and consumed in different ways, viz., roasted, ground, boiled or just soaked.

Fish curries made of free range wild fish as well as Bôralí, rôu, illish, or sitôl are the most popular. 

Another favourite combination is luchi (fried flatbread), a curry which can be vegetarian or non-vegetarian.

Many indigenous Assamese communities households still continue to brew their traditional alcoholic beverages; examples include: Laupani, Xaaj, Paniyo, Jou, Joumai, Hor, Apang, etc. Such beverages are served during traditional festivities. Declining them is considered socially offensive.

The food is often served in bell metal dishes and platters like Kanhi, Maihang and so on.

Literature 

Assamese literature dates back to the composition of Charyapada, and later on works like Saptakanda Ramayana by Madhava Kandali, which is the first translation of the Ramayana into an Indo-Aryan language, contributed to Assamese literature. Sankardeva's Borgeet, Ankia Naat, Bhaona and Satra tradition backed the 15th-16th century Assamese literature. Written during the Reign of Ahoms, the Buranjis are notable literary works which are prominently historical manuscripts. Most literary works are written in Assamese although other local language such as Bodo and Dimasa are also represented. In the 19th and 20th century, Assamese and other literature was modernised by authors including Lakshminath Bezbaroa, Birinchi Kumar Barua, Hem Barua, Dr. Mamoni Raisom Goswami, Bhabendra Nath Saikia, Birendra Kumar Bhattacharya, Hiren Bhattacharyya, Homen Borgohain, Bhabananda Deka, Rebati Mohan Dutta Choudhury, Mahim Bora, Lil Bahadur Chettri, Syed Abdul Malik, Surendranath Medhi, Hiren Gohain etc.

Fine arts 

The archaic Mauryan Stupas discovered in and around Goalpara district are the earliest examples (c. 300 BCE to c. 100 CE) of ancient art and architectural works. The remains discovered in Daparvatiya (Doporboteeya) archaeological site with a beautiful doorframe in Tezpur are identified as the best examples of artwork in ancient Assam with influence of Sarnath School of Art of the late Gupta period.

Painting is an ancient tradition of Assam. Xuanzang (7th century CE) mentions that among the Kamarupa king Bhaskaravarma's gifts to Harshavardhana there were paintings and painted objects, some of which were on Assamese silk. Many of the manuscripts such as Hastividyarnava (A Treatise on Elephants), the Chitra Bhagawata and in the Gita Govinda from the Middle Ages bear excellent examples of traditional paintings.

Traditional crafts 

Assam has a rich tradition of crafts, Cane and bamboo craft, bell metal and brass craft, silk and cotton weaving, toy and mask making, pottery and terracotta work, wood craft, jewellery making, and musical instruments making have remained as major traditions.

Cane and bamboo craft provide the most commonly used utilities in daily life, ranging from household utilities, weaving accessories, fishing accessories, furniture, musical instruments, construction materials, etc. Utilities and symbolic articles such as Sorai and Bota made from bell metal and brass are found in every Assamese household. Hajo and Sarthebari (Sorthebaary) are the most important centres of traditional bell-metal and brass crafts. Assam is the home of several types of silks, the most prestigious are: Muga – the natural golden silk, Pat – a creamy-bright-silver coloured silk and Eri – a variety used for manufacturing warm clothes for winter. Apart from Sualkuchi (Xualkuchi), the centre for the traditional silk industry, in almost every parts of the Brahmaputra Valley, rural households produce silk and silk garments with excellent embroidery designs. Moreover, various ethno-cultural groups in Assam make different types of cotton garments with unique embroidery designs and wonderful colour combinations.

Moreover, Assam possesses unique crafts of toy and mask making mostly concentrated in the Vaishnav Monasteries, pottery and terracotta work in western Assam districts and wood craft, iron craft, jewellery, etc. in many places across the region.

Media 
Print media include Assamese dailies Amar Asom, Asomiya Khabar, Asomiya Pratidin, Dainik Agradoot, Dainik Janambhumi, Dainik Asam, Gana Adhikar, Janasadharan and Niyomiya Barta.  Asom Bani, Sadin and Janambhumi are Assamese weekly newspapers. The English dailies of Assam include The Assam Tribune, The Sentinel, The Telegraph, The Times of India, The North East Times, Eastern Chronicle and The Hills Times. Thekar, in the Karbi language has the largest circulation of any daily from Karbi Anglong district. Bodosa has the highest circulation of any Bodo daily from BTR. Dainik Jugasankha is a Bengali daily with editions from Dibrugarh, Guwahati, Silchar and Kolkata. Dainik Samayik Prasanga, Dainik Prantojyoti, Dainik Janakantha and Nababarta Prasanga are other prominent Bengali dailies published in the Barak Valley towns of Karimganj and Silchar. Hindi dailies include Purvanchal Prahari, Pratah Khabar and Dainik Purvoday.

Broadcasting stations of All India Radio have been established in 22 cities across the state. Local news and music are the main priority for those stations. Assam has three public service broadcasting service stations of state-owned Doordarshan at Dibrugarh, Guwahati and Silchar. The Guwahati-based satellite news channels include Assam Talks, DY 365, News Live, News18 Assam-North East, North East Live, Prag News and Pratidin Time.

With the internet users, social media based news sites have become popular. Notable among them are North East Today, G Plus, Northeast Now, Time8 etc.

See also 
 

 Outline of Assam – comprehensive topic guide listing articles about Assam.
 List of people from Assam
 2022 Silchar Floods
 Emblem of Assam

Notes

References 

 
 
 
 
 
 
 
 
 Singh, K. S (ed) (2003) People of India: Assam Vol XV Parts I and II, Anthropological Survey of India, Seagull Books, Calcutta

Further reading 

 Online books and material
 An account of Assam (1800) by J.P. Wade
 An account of the kingdom of Heerumba  (1819) by Friend of India
 A statistical account of Assam (1879) by WW Hunter
 Assam Attitude to Federalism (1984)by Girin Phukon
 A Glimpse of Assam (1884) by Susan Ward
 A history of Assam (1906) by Edward Gait
 Physical and political geography of the province of Assam (1896) by Assam Secretariat Printing Office
 Outline Grammar of the Kachári (Bārā) Language as Spoken in District Darrang, Assam(1884) by Sidney Endle
 An outline grammar of the Deori Chutiya language spoken in upper Assam(1895) by William Barclay Brown
 Travels and adventures in the province of Assam, during a residence of fourteen years (1855) by John Butler
 Language and literature
 
 
 
 
 
 
 
 
 
 
 
 
 
 
 
 
 
 History
 
 
 
 
 
 
 
 
 
 
 
 
 
 
 
 
 
 
 
 
 
 
 
 Tradition and Culture

External links 

 Government
 Official site of the Government of Assam
 Official Tourism site of Assam
 General information
 
 

 
Northeast India
States and union territories of India
States and territories established in 1947
Tourism in Northeast India
English-speaking countries and territories